List of presidents of the Senate of Senegal.

Below is a list of office-holders:

See also
Senate (Senegal)

List
Senegal, Senate